Cemitério do Morumbi (Morumbi Cemetery) is a cemetery in São Paulo, Brazil. It is located in the affluent neighborhood of Morumbi.

Notable interments

 Ronald Golias  – Brazilian comedian
 Marly Marley  – Brazilian actress
 Elis Regina  – MPB singer who died of an overdose
 Plínio Salgado  – fascist leader, founder of Brazilian Integralist Action
 Ayrton Senna  – Formula One driver who died in Italy
 Bárbara Virgínia  – first female Portuguese film director
 Leandro Lo – Brazilian Jiu Jitsu IBJJF World Champion, killed in a shooting

References

External links
 

Morumbi